Jeff Nesbit is an American author.

Work
Nesbit's novel Perfect Ambition is the first of a three-book series surrounding the rise of a powerful political dynasty in American politics. His novel  Peace begins the day that Israel decides to attack Iran's nuclear facilities, and explores what might happen next. Nesbit is the author of 20 novels such as The Insider, Ryun's Story and The Sioux Society with Tyndale, Zondervan, Thomas Nelson, Hodder & Stoughton, Harold Shaw (now part of Random House) and Victor Books (now David C. Cook).

He was former Vice President Dan Quayle's communications director at the White House, and a senior public affairs official in the U.S. Senate and federal agencies such as the FDA. Former FDA Commissioner David Kessler credited Nesbit with convincing the FDA to regulate the tobacco industry in the early 1990s ("A Question of Intent"). Nesbit was also a national journalist with Knight-Ridder, ABC News' (now defunct) Satellite News Channels, nationally syndicated columnist Jack Anderson and others, and managed his own public affairs consulting company. He also served as the Director of the Office of Legislative and Public Affairs at the National Science Foundation.

He and Ramona Tucker co-founded OakTara Publishers, an inspirational fiction publishing house, in 2006.

Jeff graduated from Duke University in 1978.  He was on the Varsity track team and held 8 school records.

Books

Standalone novels 

Absolutely Perfect Summer
All the King's Horses
The Great Nothing Strikes Back
The Sioux Society
The Books of El
The Capital Conspiracy
The Insider: A Novel
Degrees of Betrayal: Ryun's Story

Principalities & Powers 

 Peace
 Oil
 Jude

The Capital Crew Series
Crosscourt Winner
A War of Words
The Puzzled Prodigy
The Lost Canoe
The Reluctant Runaway
Struggle with Silence

High Sierra Adventure Series
The Legend of the Great Grizzly
Cougar Chase
Setting the Trap
Mountaintop Rescue

The Worthington Destiny Series (with Kevan Leman) 

 Perfect Ambition (2015)
 A Powerful Secret (2016)
 A Primary Decision (2016)

Nonfiction 

 Poison Tea: How big oil and big tobacco invented the Tea Party and captured the GOP, 2016
 This Is the Way the World Ends: How droughts and die-offs, heat waves and hurricanes are converging on America, 2018

References

External links
Official website
isbn.nu

Living people
Year of birth missing (living people)
20th-century American novelists
21st-century American novelists
American male novelists
20th-century American male writers
21st-century American male writers